Peyman Yousefi (born 24 January 1970 in Khoy, Iran) is an Iranian football commentator, television presenter and producer. He has a master's degree in biology.

Personal life 
He is originally from the city of Khoy in the province of West Azerbaijan. He is married and has a son. According to him, he has been following sports magazines such as Donyaye Varzesh and Keyhan Varzeshi since he was a child.

Getting into reporting 
Peyman Yousefi joined the IRIB Organization in 1998 and a year later made his first report on the 1999 FIFA World Youth Championship between Argentina and Colombia. He had a bad cold that day.

Margins

Presence of women in stadiums 
In 2017, while reporting on the Iran-Syria match, he saw pictures of Syrian women attending the Azadi Stadium and spoke about the presence of women in the stadium. This comment caused him to be fired from hosting and reporting for a while, and because he was a regular participant in the Football Bartar program at the time, his vacancy was so palpable that this absence was noticed by the people.

Seyyed Morteza Mirbagheri, Deputy Director of the Islamic Republic of Iran Broadcasting, regarding the rumored ban on the employment of Peyman Yousefi, regarding his comments on the presence of women in stadiums, said:Peyman Yousefi is not banned from reporting and hosting, however we have advised our executive friends to express their views based on national interests and the network and program in which they work.  When we give a tribune to someone, that person has a specific mission, and if he wants to make a point without expert work, they do not take into account the dimensions of this statement and what cost it creates for the network and the program.  If people are going to comment on everything, it is unprofessional.  Peyman Yousefi did unprofessional work, but it was not forbidden to be reporter and presenter.But his absence for some time from game reports and football programs reinforced the rumor.

Refers to the censorship of IRIB 
In the match between Iran and Portugal in the 2018 FIFA World Cup in Russia;  Peyman Yousefi said during the report:

Reappearing on TV 
Yousefi later returned to television to report the England-Slovenia match, but was seen only as a reporter and was not given a video presence as a presenter. He finally resumed hosting a football program after a short time away from the camera.

Host of Varzesho Mardom 
Varzesho Mardom program that has been produced and performed by Bahram Shafie for many years; Every Friday; It was broadcast on IRIB TV1, after the death of Bahram Shafie, it was handed over to Peyman Yousefi.

References 

Living people
1970 births
People from Tehran
Iranian television producers
Iranian television personalities
Iranian radio and television presenters